This is a list of chancellors of Washington University in St. Louis, founded in 1853.

Board of trustees
Stephen F. Brauer Chairman Hunter Engineering (Chair)
David W. Kemper Chairman, President and CEO Commerce Bancshares, Inc. (Vice Chair)
John F. McDonnell Retired Chairman of the Board McDonnell Douglas Corporation (Vice Chair)
Stephen E. Green (MBA 1983)  Chair Alumni Board of Governors President and Chief Investment Officer Green Family Wealth Management (ex officio)
Andrew D. Martin** Chancellor Washington University in St. Louis (ex officio)
Steven H. Lipstein** President and CEO BJC HealthCare (ex officio)
John W. Bachmann Senior Partner Edward Jones
George P. Bauer (BS 1953 MS 1959) Chairman and CEO GPB Group Ltd.
Gregory H. Boyce Chairman and Chief Executive Officer Peabody Energy
Cynthia J. Brinkley Senior Vice President-Talent Development & Chief Diversity Officer AT&T Services, Inc.
Andrew M. Bursky (A.B. 1978) Chief Executive Officer Atlas Holdings LLC
Maxine Clark Chief Executive Bear Build-A-Bear Workshop
David P. Conner (A.B. 1974) Chief Executive Officer Oversea-Chinese Banking Corporation
Corinna Cotsen (M.Arch 1983) Owner Edifice Complex
George W. Couch III President Couch Distributing Company, Inc. 
John F. Dains Chief Executive Officer Helm Financial Corporation 
William Henry Danforth Chancellor Emeritus Washington University
Arnold W. Donald Former President and Chief Executive Officer Juvenile Diabetes Research Foundation St. Louis, Missouri
John P. Dubinsky (A.B. 1965) President & CEO Westmoreland Associates
Sam Fox (A.B. 1951) Former United States Ambassador to Belgium Founder and Retired Chairman and CEO Harbour Group Industries
Hugh Grant Chairman, President and CEO Monsanto Company
David V. Habif, Jr. Retired Director Teaneck Radiology Center 
James H. Hance, Jr. (MBA 1968) Retired Vice Chairman Bank of America Corporation 
Robert Hernreich Co-Owner, Arizona Rattlers Co-Owner, Sacramento Kings 
Priscilla L. Hill-Ardoin Retired Senior Vice President for Regulatory Compliance & Chief Privacy Officer AT&T Services, Inc. 
Louis G. Hutt, Jr. Managing Member Bennett, Hutt & Co., LLC
Eugene S. Kahn Chief Executive Officer Claire's Stores 
Jerald L. Kent President and CEO Cequel III, LLP
Steven F. Leer Chairman and Chief Executive Officer Arch Coal
Lee M. Liberman Chairman Emeritus Laclede Gas Company
W. Patrick McGinnis (MBA 1972): President and CEO Nestlé Purina PetCare
Walter L. Metcalfe, Jr. (A.B. 1960) Senior Counsel Bryan Cave LLP
Jai Nagarkatti President and CEO Sigma-Aldrich Corporation
William B. Neaves Chief Executive Officer Stowers Institute for Medical Research
Philip Needleman Former Chief Scientist Pharmacia and Monsanto/Searle; Former Professor and Head, Department of Pharmacology Washington University School of Medicine
Andrew E. Newman Chairman Hackett Security, Inc
James V. O'Donnell President and CEO Bush O'Donnell & Company, Inc
George Paz Chairman, President and CEO Express Scripts, Inc.
Gordon W. Philpott Emeritus Professor of Surgery Washington University School of Medicine
Gary L. Rainwater Executive Chairman Ameren Corporation
Steven N. Rappaport (J.D. 1974): Partner RZ Capital LLC 
Harvey Saligman General Partner Cynwyd Investments
Craig D. Schnuck Chairman of the Executive Committee Schnucks
Harry J. Seigle (A.B. 1968): Principal The Elgin Company 
William T. Shearer (M.D. 1970): Professor of Pediatrics and Immunology Baylor College of Medicine
Robert J. Skandalaris Managing Partner Quantum Ventures of Michigan, LLC 
Andrew C. Taylor Chairman and CEO Enterprise Rent-A-Car
Barbara Schaps Thomas Senior Vice President and Chief Financial Officer HBO Sports 
Jack E. Thomas Chairman and CEO Coin Acceptors, Inc.
Lawrence E. Thomas Partner Edward Jones
Ronald L. Thompson Retired Chairman of the Board and CEO Midwest Stamping Company
Ann Rubenstein Tisch (BA 1976) Founder The Young Women's Leadership Foundation
Shinichiro Watari Chairman Cornes & Co. Ltd.
John D. Weil President Clayton Management Company
Howard L. Wood Co-Founder and Chairman Cequel III, LLC 
Arnold B. Zetcher (BSBA 1962) Retired Chairman, President and CEO of Talbots 

 List
Chancellors
Washington University in St. Louis
Washington University in St. Louis